George William McVey (September 16, 1865 – May 3, 1896) was an American professional baseball player. He played one season with the Brooklyn Grays, appearing in three games each at first base, and catcher in 1885.

External links
Baseball-Reference page
Baseball Almanac

1865 births
1896 deaths
19th-century baseball players
Baseball players from New York (state)
Major League Baseball first basemen
Major League Baseball catchers
Brooklyn Grays players
People from Port Jervis, New York
Chillicothe Logans players
Atlanta Atlantas players
Chattanooga Lookouts players
Nashville Americans players
Mobile Swamp Angels players
New Orleans Pelicans (baseball) players
Columbus Senators players
Evansville Hoosiers players
Denver Grizzlies (baseball) players
Denver Mountaineers players
St. Joseph Clay Eaters players
Walla Walla Walla Wallas players
Sandusky Sandies players
Omaha Omahogs players
Quincy Browns players
Quincy Ravens players
St. Joseph Saints players